School for Girls is a 1935 American drama film directed by William Nigh and starring Sidney Fox, Paul Kelly and Lois Wilson. After being convicted of stealing, a young woman is sent to a reformatory administered by a sadistic and corrupt woman. However, one of the board of trustees takes an interest in the new arrival and begins to investigate the management of the institution.

Cast

 Sidney Fox as Annette Edlridge  
 Paul Kelly as Garry Waltham  
 Lois Wilson as Miss Cartwright  
 Lucille La Verne as Miss Keeble  
 Dorothy Lee as Dorothy Bosworth  
 Toby Wing as Hazel Jones  
 Dorothy Appleby as Florence Burns  
 Lona Andre as Peggy  
 Russell Hopton as Elliott Robbins, aka Buck Kreegar 
 Barbara Weeks as Nell Davis  
 Kathleen Burke as Gladys Deacon  
 Anna Q. Nilsson as Dr. Anne Galvin  
 Purnell Pratt as Inspector Jameson  
 Robert Warwick as Governor  
 William Farnum as Charles Waltham  
 Charles Ray as Duke  
 Mary Foy as Miss Gage  
 Anne Shirley as Catherine Fogarty 
 Myrtle Stedman as Mrs. Winters  
 Eddie Kane as Ted 
 Gretta Gould as Mrs. Smoot  
 George Cleveland as Reeves  
 Helene Chadwick as Larson  
 Helen Foster as Eleanor  
 Fred Kelsey as Detective  
 Edward LeSaint as Judge  
 Harry Woods as Detective  
 Jack Kennedy as Hansen

References

Bibliography
 Pitts, Michael R. Poverty Row Studios, 1929–1940: An Illustrated History of 55 Independent Film Companies, with a Filmography for Each. McFarland & Company, 2005.

External links
 

1934 films
1930s crime drama films
American crime drama films
Films directed by William Nigh
American black-and-white films
1934 drama films
1930s English-language films
1930s American films